Street Sounds Hip Hop Electro 16 is the sixteenth compilation album in a series and was released 1987 on the StreetSounds label. The album was released on LP and cassette and contains nine electro music and old school hip hop tracks mixed by Herbie Laidley.

Track listing

References

External links
 Street Sounds Hip Hop Electro 16 at Discogs

1987 compilation albums
Hip hop compilation albums
Electro compilation albums